Kroonstad Airport  is an airport serving Kroonstad in the Free State province of South Africa.

Facilities

See also
 List of airports in South Africa
 List of South African airports by passenger movements

References

External links
 
 
 FAKS on FlightStats

Airports in South Africa
Transport in the Free State (province)
Buildings and structures in the Free State (province)
Moqhaka